Yanowsky is a Russian surname. Notable people with the surname include:

Nadia Yanowsky, Spanish ballet dancer
Yury Yanowsky (born 1972), Spanish ballet dancer
 Zenaida Yanowsky (born 1975), Spanish ballet dancer

Russian-language surnames